Skyline High School is a public high school in the eastern part of Mesa, Arizona. Skyline is the youngest of the six high schools located in the Mesa Unified School District. Skyline opened in 1999 and houses students in grades 9–12. Skyline High School is a four-year, public, comprehensive high school with an estimated enrollment of 2,400 students. The school is accredited by the North Central Association.

Demographics
During the 2020-2021 school year, the demographic break of the 2,389 students enrolled was:
 Male – 50.1%
 Female – 49.9%
 Native American/Alaskan – 2.15%
 Asian – 1.3%
 Black – 4.6%
 Hispanic – 46.2%
 Native Hawaiian/Pacific Islander – 0.5%
 White – 43.5%
 Multiracial – 1.8%

Athletics
 Badminton
 Baseball
 Cross Country
 Soccer
 Softball
 B/G Tennis
 B/G Golf
 B/G Track and Field
 B/G Volleyball
 B/G Basketball
 B/G Soccer
 Wrestling
 Swim and Dive
 Cheer
 JROTC
 Pom

Basketball

Football 

Awards:
 All-Region Champions: 4x
 All-City Champions: 3x
 Coach of the Year (Angelo Paffumi): 3x

Feeder Schools 
 Fremont Junior High School
 Smith Junior High School

Notable alumni 
 Kennedy McMann (2014) – Singer and Actress who is currently starring on the CW's Nancy Drew. She has also appeared in Law & Order: Special Victims Unit and Gone.
 Braedon Bowman – Tight end who is currently a free agent. Formerly of the Los Angeles Chargers, New Orleans Saints, NY Jets, Jacksonville Jaquars and Birmingham Iron. Junior-College All American while attending Scottsdale Junior College & later attended, played & graduated from University of South Alabama.

References

Public high schools in Arizona
Educational institutions established in 1999
High schools in Mesa, Arizona
1999 establishments in Arizona